Tinker v. Des Moines Independent Community School District, 393 U.S. 503 (1969), was a landmark decision by the United States Supreme Court that defined First Amendment rights of students in U.S. public schools. The Tinker test, also known as the "substantial disruption" test, is still used by courts today to determine whether a school's interest to prevent disruption infringes upon students' First Amendment rights.

Background
In 1965, five students in Des Moines, Iowa, decided to wear black armbands to school in protest of American involvement in the Vietnam War and supporting the Christmas Truce that was called for by Senator Robert F. Kennedy. Among the students were John F. Tinker (15 years old), his siblings Mary Beth Tinker (13 years old), Hope Tinker (11 years old), and Paul Tinker (8 years old), along with their friend Christopher Eckhardt (16 years old). The students wore the armbands to several schools in the Des Moines Independent Community School District (North High School for John, Roosevelt High School for Christopher, Warren Harding Junior High School for Mary Beth, elementary school for Hope and Paul).

The Tinker family had been involved in civil rights activism before the student protest. The Tinker children's mother, Lorena, was a leader of the Peace Organization in Des Moines. Christopher Eckhardt and John Tinker attended a protest the previous month against the Vietnam War in Washington, D.C. The principals of the Des Moines schools learned of the plan and met before the incident occurred on December 16 to create a policy that stated that school children wearing an armband would be asked to remove it immediately. Students violating the policy would be suspended and allowed to return to school after agreeing to comply with it. The participants decided to violate this policy. Hope and Paul Tinker were not in violation of the policy, since the policy was not applicable to elementary schools, and were not punished. No violence or disruption was proven to have occurred due to the students wearing the armbands. Mary Beth Tinker and Christopher Eckhardt were suspended from school for wearing the armbands on December 16 and John Tinker was suspended for doing the same on the following day.

Legal precedents and issues
Previous decisions, such as West Virginia State Board of Education v. Barnette, had established that students did have some constitutional protections in public school. This case was the first time that the court set forth standards for safeguarding public school students' free speech rights. This case involved symbolic speech, which was first recognized in Stromberg v. California.

Lower courts 
A suit was filed after the Iowa Civil Liberties Union approached the Tinker family, and the ACLU agreed to help with the lawsuit. Dan Johnston was the lead attorney on the case.

The Des Moines Independent Community School District represented the school officials who suspended the students. The children's fathers filed suit in the U.S. District Court, which upheld the decision of the Des Moines school board.

A tie vote in the U.S. Court of Appeals for the 8th Circuit meant that the U.S. District Court's decision continued to stand, which forced the Tinkers and Eckhardts to appeal to the Supreme Court directly.

The only students involved in the lawsuit were Mary Beth Tinker, John Tinker, and Christopher Eckhardt. During the case, the Tinker family received hate mail, death threats, and other hateful messages.

The case was argued before the court on November 12, 1968. It was funded by the Des Moines residents Louise Noun, who was the president of the Iowa Civil Liberties Union, and her brother, Joseph Rosenfield, a businessman.

Decision

Majority opinion 
The court's 7–2 decision held that the First Amendment applied to public schools, and that administrators would have to demonstrate constitutionally valid reasons for any specific regulation of speech in the classroom. The court observed, "It can hardly be argued that either students or teachers shed their constitutional rights to freedom of speech or expression at the schoolhouse gate." Justice Abe Fortas wrote the majority opinion, holding that the speech regulation at issue in Tinker was "based upon an urgent wish to avoid the controversy which might result from the expression, even by the silent symbol of armbands, of opposition to this Nation's part in the conflagration in Vietnam." This decision made students and adults equal in terms of First Amendment rights while at school. Bethel School District v. Fraser and Hazelwood v. Kuhlmeier later rewrote this implication, limiting the freedoms granted to students.

The Court held that for school officials to justify censoring speech, they "must be able to show that [their] action was caused by something more than a mere desire to avoid the discomfort and unpleasantness that always accompany an unpopular viewpoint," that the conduct that would "materially and substantially interfere with the requirements of appropriate discipline in the operation of the school." The Court found that the actions of the Tinkers in wearing armbands did not cause disruption and held that their activity represented constitutionally protected symbolic speech. The Court ruled that First Amendment rights were not absolute, and could be withheld if there was a “carefully restricted circumstance.” Student speech that has the potential to cause disruption is not protected by Tinker.

Dissents
Justices Hugo Black and John M. Harlan II dissented. Black, who had long believed that disruptive "symbolic speech" was not constitutionally protected, wrote, "While I have always believed that under the First and Fourteenth Amendments neither the State nor the Federal Government has any authority to regulate or censor the content of speech, I have never believed that any person has a right to give speeches or engage in demonstrations where he pleases and when he pleases." Black argued that the Tinkers' behavior was indeed disruptive and declared, "I repeat that if the time has come when pupils of state-supported schools, kindergarten, can defy and flout orders of school officials to keep their minds on their own schoolwork, it is the beginning of a new revolutionary era of permissiveness in this country fostered by the judiciary."

Harlan dissented on the grounds that he "[found] nothing in this record which impugns the good faith of respondents in promulgating the armband regulation."

Legacy

Subsequent jurisprudence
Tinker remains a viable and frequently cited court precedent, and court decisions citing Tinker have both protected and limited the scope of student free speech rights. Tinker was cited in the 1973 court case Papish v. Board of Curators of the University of Missouri, which ruled that the expulsion of a student for distributing a newspaper on campus containing what the school deemed to be "indecent speech" violated the First Amendment. In the 1986 court case Bethel School District v. Fraser, the Supreme Court ruled that a high school student's sexual innuendo-laden speech during a school assembly was not constitutionally protected. The court said the protection of student political speech created in the Tinker case did not extend to vulgar language in a school setting. The court ruled that similar language may be constitutionally protected if used by adults to make a political point, but that those protections did not apply to students in a public school.

Hazelwood v. Kuhlmeier was a 1988 court case where a high school principal blocked the school paper from publishing two articles about divorce and teenage pregnancy. The Supreme Court ruled that schools have the right to regulate the content of non-forum, school-sponsored newspapers under "legitimate pedagogical concerns." The court reasoned that the principal's editorial decision was justified because the paper was a non-public forum since it was school-sponsored and existed as a platform for students in a journalism class. The Court in Hazelwood said that under the doctrine of Perry Education Association v. Perry Local Educators Association, a 1982 court case that clarified the definition of a public forum, a school facility like a newspaper only qualifies as a public forum if school authorities make those facilities available for "indiscriminate use by the general public."

The Court's rulings in Fraser and Hazelwood state that a “substantial disruption” or infringing on the rights of other students was reason enough to restrict student freedom of speech or expression. Some experts argue that the three individual cases each act independently of one another and govern different types of student speech. It is argued that Fraser does not interfere with Tinker, since Fraser questions sexual speech while Tinker protects political speech. While some believe that Tinker's protections were overturned by Fraser and Kuhlmeier, others believe that the latter cases created exceptions to the Tinker ruling. Others argue that a broad reading of Tinker allows for viewpoint discrimination on certain topics of student speech.

In 2013, the U.S. Court of Appeals for the Third Circuit re-heard a case en banc that had been argued before a panel of three of its judges, considering whether middle school students could be prohibited from wearing bracelets promoting breast cancer awareness that were imprinted with "I ♥ Boobies! (Keep a Breast)." The Third Circuit cited Tinker when ruling that the school's ban on the bracelets violated the students' right to free speech because the bracelets were not plainly offensive or disruptive. The court also cited Fraser, saying the bracelets were not lewd speech. The Supreme Court later declined to take up the case.

Several cases have arisen from the modern display of the Confederate flag. Courts applying the "substantial disruption test" under Tinker have held that schools may prohibit students from wearing clothing with Confederate symbols. The U.S. Court of Appeals for the Fourth Circuit cited Tinker in the 2013 court case Hardwick v. Heyward to rule that prohibiting a student from wearing Confederate flag shirt did not violate the First Amendment because there was evidence that the shirt could cause disruption. Exceptions to this are the 2010 court case Defoe v. Spiva and the 2000 court case Castorina v. Madison County School Board. The U.S. Court of Appeals for the Sixth Circuit said in Castorina v. Madison County School Board that based on Tinker and other Supreme Court rulings, the school board could not ban Confederate flag T-shirts while other "controversial racial and political symbols" like the "X" symbol associated with Malcolm X and the African American Muslim movement were permitted. In Defoe v. Spiva, the U.S. Court of Appeals for the Sixth Circuit ruled that "racially hostile or contemptuous speech" can be restricted, even if it was not disruptive. This deviated from the Tinker ruling, which said the school's restriction of the Tinkers' speech was unconstitutional because it was not disruptive.

The U.S. Court of Appeals for the Ninth Circuit applied Tinker  in February 2014 to rule that a California school did not violate the First Amendment in Dariano v. Morgan Hill Unified School District, where a school banned American flag apparel during a Cinco de Mayo celebration. The school said they had enacted the ban due to a conflict caused by American flag apparel that had occurred at the event the previous year. The Ninth Circuit declined to re-hear the case en banc and the U.S. Supreme Court later declined to review the case.

A Pennsylvania high school cheerleader, who had been reprimanded by her school for using offensive language in a social media post that she made off-campus and outside school hours, filed suit against the school in 2017 claiming her First Amendment rights had been infringed. The district court ruled in her favor, and the school district appealed to the Third Circuit. There, the three-judge panel upheld the district ruling unanimously, but the majority stated that Tinker could never apply to off-campus speech made by a student, while Judge Thomas L. Ambro believed this was too broad a claim. The school petitioned to the Supreme Court, which ruled in June 2021 in Mahanoy Area School District v. B.L. to uphold the ruling in favor of the student, but overturning the decision of the Third Circuit in that Tinker may cover some parts of off-campus speech when the school has a compelling interest, such as for incidents of harassments or threats. However, the Supreme Court did not attempt to define when such off-campus speech fell under a school's compelling interest.

Tinker Tour 
Mary Beth Tinker decided to embark on a tour around the United States, called the Tinker Tour, beginning in 2013 to "bring real-life civics lessons to students through the Tinker armband story and the stories of other young people." The tour is a project of the Student Press Law Center.

See also

 List of United States Supreme Court cases, volume 393
 Schenck v. United States, 
 Shanley v. Northeast Independent School District (1972)
 Miller v. California, 
 Broussard v. School Board of Norfolk (1992)
 Gillman v. Holmes County School District (2008)

References

External links
 
 
 First Amendment Library entry on Tinker v. Des Moines Independent Community School District
 Schema-root.org: Tinker v. Des Moines John Tinker's page about Tinker v. Des Moines. Contains a current news feed.
 Background summary and questions about the case
 Tinker v. Des Moines from C-SPAN's Landmark Cases: Historic Supreme Court Decisions

Opposition to United States involvement in the Vietnam War
United States Supreme Court cases
United States Free Speech Clause case law
Student rights case law in the United States
Education in Des Moines, Iowa
1969 in United States case law
American Civil Liberties Union litigation
United States Supreme Court cases of the Warren Court
Armbands